Metamorfosis may refer to:

 Metamorfosis (record label), an American record label
 Metamorfosis (Ednita Nazario album), 1992
 Metamorfosis (Vega album), 2009
 Metamorfosis, 2002 album by Cenobita
 Metamorfosis, 2017 album by Jeans (band)

See also
 Metamorphosis (disambiguation)
 Metamorphoses (disambiguation)
 Metamorfosi (disambiguation)